Céline Garcia (born 6 January 1976) is a French rower. She competed at the 1996 Summer Olympics and the 2000 Summer Olympics.

References

1976 births
Living people
French female rowers
Olympic rowers of France
Rowers at the 1996 Summer Olympics
Rowers at the 2000 Summer Olympics
People from Dole, Jura
Sportspeople from Jura (department)
21st-century French women
20th-century French women